The 2021 Missouri Tigers baseball team represents the University of Missouri in the 2021 NCAA Division I baseball season. The Tigers play their home games at Taylor Stadium under fifth year coach Steve Bieser.

Previous season

The 2020 Missouri Tigers baseball team finished the regular season with a 11–5 (0–0) record. The season ended on March 12, 2020 due to concerns over the COVID-19 pandemic.

2020 MLB Draft
The Tigers had one player drafted in the 2020 MLB draft shortened draft, from 40 rounds down to five.

Personnel

Roster

Coaching Staff

Schedule and results

Schedule Source:
*Rankings are based on the team's current ranking in the D1Baseball poll.

Record vs. conference opponents

2021 MLB draft

References

Missouri
Missouri Tigers baseball seasons
Missouri Tigers baseball